is a Japanese water polo player who was ranked 7th in the overall Top Scorers at the 2017 World Championships and 3rd at the 2019 World Championships. She will be part of the team in the women's water polo tournament at the 2020 Summer Olympics.

References

Living people
1997 births
Japanese female water polo players
Universiade medalists in water polo
Universiade bronze medalists for Japan
Asian Games medalists in water polo
Water polo players at the 2018 Asian Games
Asian Games bronze medalists for Japan
Medalists at the 2018 Asian Games
Medalists at the 2017 Summer Universiade
Water polo players at the 2020 Summer Olympics
Olympic water polo players of Japan
21st-century Japanese women